Circus of Strange is a fictional organization appearing in American comic books published by DC Comics.

Publication history
The Circus of Strange first appeared in Batman and Robin #1 and were created by Grant Morrison and Frank Quitely.

Fictional team history
The Circus of Strange is a criminal group led by Professor Pyg which first became known to Batman and Robin when they had captured one of its members known as Mister Toad who warned them that Professor Pyg will retaliate against Batman. Batman and Robin leave Mister Toad on the roof of the Gotham City Police Department. Professor Pyg later appears at the house of a fleeing criminal named Niko where he has his assistants tie the criminal to the table as he melts a doll mask onto Niko's face. Professor Pyg plans to do the same thing to Niko's daughter. When the Circus of Strange members Big Top, Phosphorus Rex, Siam, and the Dollotrons storm the Gotham City Police Department, Batman and Robin help to fight them; four police officers were killed and six other police officers were injured. After Batman and Robin defeated the Circus of Strange, they found that Toad is dead in his cell holding a domino. During a training exercise, Robin is captured by the Dollotrons. Batman discovers that Professor Pyg is planning to make specific people into his Dollotrons. When Robin regains consciousness, he meets Professor Pyg who does some circus acts before having his Dollotrons prepare to melt a doll mask onto Robin's face. When Batman arrives, Robin breaks free and helps to defeat Professor Pyg.

In 2011, "The New 52" rebooted the DC universe. Professor Pyg and Phosphorus Rex are reintroduced as inmates of Arkham Asylum.

The Circus of Strange are shown to be a part of Talia al Ghul's Leviathan organization.

Members
 Professor Pyg - Leader of the Circus of Strange.
 Big Top - A bearded fat lady in a tutu that is a member of the Circus of Strange.
 Dollotrons - The brainwashed, doll-masked minions of Professor Pyg and the Circus of Strange.
 Mister Toad - The toad-like member of the Circus of Strange.
 Phosphorus Rex - The pyrokinetic member of the Circus of Strange.
 Kushti - Conjoined triplets who are members of the Circus of Strange.

In other media
Members of the Circus of Strange appear in Beware the Batman, but not as a group. Professor Pyg (voiced by Brian George) and Mister Toad (voiced by Udo Kier) are depicted as eco-terrorists. Phosphorus Rex (voiced by Greg Ellis) is depicted as a lawyer named Milo Match who works for Tobias Whale.

See also
 List of Batman Family enemies

References

External links
 Circus of Strange at DC Comics Wiki
 Circus of Strange at Comic Vine

DC Comics supervillain teams
Characters created by Grant Morrison
Characters created by Frank Quitely